Dato Anyi Ngau (born  1959) is a Malaysian politician who has been serving as the Member of the Dewan Rakyat for Baram since 2013.

Anyi made his political debut at the 2013 election when he contested for Baram and was elected. He was re-nominated for the same constituency at the 2018 election, despite rumours that a direct candidate from the then ruling Barisan Nasional (BN) would be nominated. He was re-elected, defeating the People's Justice Party (PKR) candidate Roland Engan, who is also his nephew, with a majority of 1,990 votes.

In March 2020, when Muhyiddin Yassin was appointed Prime Minister, he nominated a Progressive Democratic Party (PDP) MP Tiong King Sing as the Deputy Minister of National Unity, which Tiong refused the bid. There was a speculation that Anyi, another PDP MP, could be appointed instead Tiong, but was never happened. The position was taken away by Ti Lian Ker from the Malaysian Chinese Association (MCA). Instead, he was appointed Chairman of Malaysia Cocoa Board on 20 May, replacing Jonathan Yasin. He was also appointed Chairman of Malaysian Pepper Board on 1 July.

Anyi is of Kenyah descent and graduated from Universiti Sains Malaysia (USM).

Honour

Honour of Malaysia 
  :
 Commander of the Most Exalted Order of the Star of Sarawak (PSBS) – Dato (2022)

Election results

References 

Living people
Kenyah people
Dayak people
1959 births
Progressive Democratic Party (Malaysia) politicians